Paul Eugène Nivoix (December 24, 1889 - September 14, 1958) was a French playwright and screenwriter.

Theater
With Marcel Pagnol:

 Tonton 1924 
 Les Marchands de gloire 1925
 Un direct au cœur 1926.

Filmography
 1932:  A little love  by Hans Steinhoff, adaptation and dialogue.
 1932:  Direct to the heart  by Roger Lion and Alexandre Arnaudy, script and dialogue, from his play co-written with Marcel Pagnol.
 1937:  In Venice, one night  by Christian-Jaque, screenplay.
 1937:  The House opposite  by Christian-Jaque, screenplay from his play.
 1938:  Barnabé  by Alexandre Esway, dialogue.
 1943:  Mahlia the mestizo  by Walter Kapps, dialogue.
 1948:  Émile l'Africain  by Robert Vernay, screenplay.
 1949:  The New Masters  by Paul Nivoix, realization, after his eponymous play.

References

External links
 

French dramatists and playwrights
1889 births
1958 deaths